"End of the Night" is a song by the American psychedelic rock band the Doors. It was featured on the band's debut album and then released as the B-side to the album's first single, "Break On Through (To the Other Side)" in January 1967.

After the band's rise to fame the song was rarely played live in concert; it has since been included in box sets released over the years by the band.

Composition and lyrics
"End of the Night" is essentially a psychedelic track, notated in the key of E Minor, with Jim Morrison's vocal range spanning from D4 to G5. It is also performed throughout in 4/4 time. The song was written in the band's early days, before guitarist Robby Krieger had joined the group. It was recorded in 1965 by the band in an attempt to land a deal with Aura Records; however the band failed to get signed. In 1966, when they were signed to Elektra Records, the song was recorded for their self-titled debut album. In the album recording, Krieger provided a distinct slide guitar, tuned in a minor tuning. As Krieger himself explained, "I'd try different tunings until one worked..."

Although the songwriting credit was given to all four members of the Doors, the lyrics were written by lead singer Jim Morrison.  Its title is derived from the 1932 French novel Journey to the End of the Night by Louis-Ferdinand Celine. The line "Some are born to sweet delight; some are born to endless night" are lifted from a William Blake poem Auguries of Innocence, written in 1803 and published in 1863.

Release and reception

The song was chosen as the B-side to the album's first single, "Break On Through (To the Other Side)" and was released in January 1967. The single, however, failed to become a success and only peaked at number 126 in the U.S. Reviewing the "Break on Through" single, Cash Box said that "End of the Night" is a "bluesy shuffler that also merits watching."

PopMatters critic Andy Hermann declared "End of the Night" as one of the "weirder" and moodier songs in the Doors' catalogue.
In an AllMusic album review of The Doors, critic Richie Unterberger described the song's melody as being "mysterious", and noted that it was one of several tunes of the album besides "Light My Fire" that "also had hit potential". Sal Cinquemani of Slant Magazine praised Krieger’s guitar solo, for being "sufficiently trippy," but he wrote that the song was "less ambitious (and less successful)" than the other album tracks.  Sputnikmusic reviewer Ian Philips noted that the "dreamy, mysterious 'End of the Night'" highlights "the group's remarkable affinity for shrewd, poetic, profound lyrics."

References

External links
 

1966 songs
1967 singles
American blues rock songs
American psychedelic rock songs
Elektra Records singles
Song recordings produced by Paul A. Rothchild
Songs written by Jim Morrison
Songs written by John Densmore
Songs written by Ray Manzarek
Songs written by Robby Krieger
The Doors songs